R.U.N.N. Family were a Zimbabwean musical group that had several hits in the 1980s, whose songs combined mbira-inspired music with reggae and rhumba influences.

Background
The group was made up of siblings from the Muparutsa family, the best known of whom are the late Fortune and his brother, lead singer and bassist [Peter Muparutsa], who became a studio engineer at Harare's premier recording studio Shed Studios, and continues to work in the music industry.

Hatichina Wekutamba Naye
One of the R.U.N.N. family's most successful songs was "Hatichina Wekutamba Naye", a lament for the recently deceased President of Mozambique Samora Machel. The short description given to the song on album artwork states:"Someone keeps stirring and heating the pot. Chitepo (sic), Biko and now Samora Machel. They kill our friends. We can only pray to God and remember the inheritance of Samora Machel. Our life is the struggle."
This description refers to the controversy surrounding the aircrash in which Machel perished. Released in 1986 on the ZIM label (cat. # ZIM 410), the song proved popular enough to feature alongside Paul Matavire & the Jairos Jiri Band and Jonah Moyo on a compilation of Zimbabwean hits produced by the DiscAfrique label, best known for bringing the Bhundu Boys to international attention.

The late Charlie Gillett lauded the song as:"One of the great soul records of the 1980s."

See also
List of African musicians

Media
Hear a sample of Hachina Wekutamba Naye

References

Zimbabwean musical groups